Burden or burthen may refer to:

People
 Burden (surname), people with the surname Burden

Places
 Burden, Kansas, United States
 Burden, Luxembourg

Arts, entertainment, and media

Films
 Burden (2018 film), an American drama film
 The Burden (film), a Swedish independent short film

Literature
The Burden, by Agatha Christie, 1956
The Burdens, a play by John Ruganda, 1972

Music

Songs
 "Burden", a single by Opeth from the album Watershed
 "Burden", a 2019 song by Keith Urban
 "Burdens", a song by Kenny Wayne Shepherd from The Place You're In
 "Burdens", a song by The Yawpers
 "The Burden", an interlude by Memphis May Fire from the album The Hollow

Other uses in music
 A drone (sometimes spelt bourdon or burdon) produced by certain instruments
 Burden (or burthen), a refrain in English hymns and songs
 Burdens (album), a 2006 album by Ava Inferi

Other uses
 Burden, an old accounting term for overhead (O/H) costs
 Burden, in electrical engineering is the impedance presented to the secondary winding of a Current transformer
 Burden (or burthen), an old term for ship's tonnage of cargo carrying capacity, from the archaic "burthen" or "byrthen"

See also
Burden of proof (disambiguation)
Burdon (disambiguation)
Onus (disambiguation)